George William Cook (January 7, 1855 – August 20, 1931) was an American educator who served as instructor, dean, alumni secretary and manager at Howard University. Born a slave in Winchester, Virginia, he was one of 8 children of Eliza and Peyton Cook. He graduated from the university, as a student of both the liberal arts college, and the law school. His career spanned fifty-eight of the first sixty-six of Howard University's history.

He also served on the executive board of Directors of the Washington, DC NAACP from its inception until his death, which occurred in Philadelphia.

References 

1855 births
1931 deaths
Howard University alumni
Howard University faculty
People from Winchester, Virginia